Colombo District ( kol̠am̆ba distrikkaya;  Koḻumpu Māvaṭṭam) is one of the 25 districts of Sri Lanka, the second level administrative division of the country. The district is administered by a District Secretariat headed by a District Secretary (previously known as a Government Agent) appointed by the central government of Sri Lanka. The capital of the district is the city of Colombo. The district of Colombo was officially recorded in 2016 as having the highest income on average, per household.

History
Colombo District was part of the pre-colonial Kingdom of Kotte. The district then came under Portuguese, Dutch and British control. In 1815 the British gained control of the entire island of Ceylon. They divided the island into three ethnic based administrative structures: Low Country Sinhalese, Kandyan Sinhalese and Tamil. Colombo District was part of the Low Country Sinhalese administration. In 1833, in accordance with the recommendations of the Colebrooke-Cameron Commission, the ethnic based administrative structures were unified into a single administration divided into five geographic provinces. Colombo District, together with Kalutara, Puttalam, Seven Korales (present day Kurunegala District), Three Korales, Four Korales and Lower Bulatgama (present day Kegalle District) formed the new Western Province. At the time that Ceylon gained independence, Colombo was one of the two districts located in the Western Province. Parts of the district were transferred to newly created Gampaha District in September 1978.

Geography

Administrative units
Colombo District is divided into 13 Divisional Secretary's Division (DS Divisions), each headed by a Divisional Secretary (previously known as an Assistant Government Agent). The DS Divisions are further sub-divided into 566 Grama Niladhari Divisions (GN Divisions).

Cities and Towns

Demographics

Population
Colombo District's population was 2,309,809 in 2012. It has the highest population and population density in Sri Lanka. The majority of the population are Sinhalese, with a minority Sri Lankan Moor and Sri Lankan Tamil population.

Ethnicity

Religion

Notes

References

External links

 Colombo District Secretariat

 
Districts of Sri Lanka